Gilbert Soulié, SS.CC., (born Antoine Soulié; 1800 – 13 June 1863) was a French Catholic Catechist brother of the Congregation of the Sacred Hearts of Jesus and Mary, a religious institute of the Roman Catholic Church. He was part of the Roman Catholic mission in the Gambier Islands from 1835 until his death in 1863 and with Brother Fabien Costes trained the natives workers and masons in the construction of many of the island's impressive buildings including St. Michael's Cathedral in Rikitea.

References

Bibliography

1800 births
1863 deaths
French Roman Catholic missionaries
French Polynesian Roman Catholics
Roman Catholic missionaries in French Polynesia
People from the Gambier Islands
Picpus Fathers
People from Lot (department)